South King Street Historic District is a national historic district located at Morganton, Burke County, North Carolina.  It encompasses 10 contributing buildings in Morganton. It includes residential, religious, and educational buildings built between about 1893 and 1939. It includes representative examples of Colonial Revival, Georgian Revival, and Gothic Revival style architecture. Notable buildings include the Grace Episcopal Church (c. 1893), Morganton Library (c. 1935), and Works Progress Administration constructed nurses' home.

It was listed on the National Register of Historic Places in 1987.

References

Historic districts on the National Register of Historic Places in North Carolina
Gothic Revival architecture in North Carolina
Colonial Revival architecture in North Carolina
Georgian Revival architecture in North Carolina
Historic districts in Burke County, North Carolina
National Register of Historic Places in Burke County, North Carolina